Åke Falck (3 April 1925 – 12 October 1974) was a Swedish film director. He directed 13 films between 1958 and 1972. His 1966 film The Princess was entered into the 5th Moscow International Film Festival.

He married in 1949 the singer Brita Nordström (1925–2005) with whom he had a son Peter Emanuel Falck in 1952. In 1960 he remarried to the TV producer Karin Sohlman and had a daughter Carolina Falck in 1961.

Åke Falck was buried on 12 November 1974 at Djursholm's cemetery in the municipality of Danderyd. Åke Falcks Gata in the Torp district of Gothenburg was named after him in 2011.

Filmography

References

External links

1925 births
1974 deaths
Swedish film directors
People from Gothenburg
20th-century Swedish people